Baber is an English surname that may refer to:

 Alice Baber, American painter
 Ambrose Baber, American doctor and diplomat
 Asa Baber, American author
 Billy Baber, American football player
 Edward Baber (MP), English politician
 Edward Colborne Baber, English orientalist 
 Esther Mary Baber, New Zealand headmistress
 Gareth Baber, Welsh rugby footballer 
 Harriet Baber, American philosopher
 Henry Hervey Baber, English philologist
 John Baber (footballer), English footballer
 John Baber (MP), English lawyer and politician
 Sir John Baber physician to Charles II 
 Joseph Baber, American composer 
 Roman Baber, Canadian politician 
 Zonia Baber, American geographer and geologist

fr:Baber